Charles Arthur Conant (July 2, 1861 – July 5, 1915) was an American journalist, author, and promoter who became recognized as an expert on banking and finance.

Conant was descended from one of the earliest New England settlers (Roger Conant) and was born in Winchester, Massachusetts. He studied in public schools and with private tutors, and between 1889 and 1901 was the correspondent in Washington, D.C., for the New York Journal of Commerce and Commercial Bulletin.

In 1901–1902 he was in the Philippines to investigate coinage and banking, on a commission organized by the U.S. Secretary of War.  He returned to take a positions as treasurer of the Morton Trust Company of New York where he specialized in overseas banking. In 1915 Elihu Root sent him to Cuba, but he died of a fever there.

Work

In retrospect, Conant's most important work consists of journal articles collected in The United States and the Orient, in which he argued, before John A. Hobson and Vladimir Lenin, that imperialism was a natural, necessary, and ultimately positive outgrowth of capitalism.

Conant was also amongst the first economists to articulate the economic utility of speculation on organized stock exchanges.  In essays that were collected in the book "Wall Street and the Country, "He argued, in what is a familiar formulation today, that stock prices reflect all of the information available about a corporation, economic conditions, etc., and that those prices were thus a measure of a stock's "true value."  The trends of the market, he concluded, were an indication of where the nation's capital could most profitably be invested.  His main caveat was that pure gambling by uninformed speculators could hurt the market's ability to reflect true values.  He urged that speculation only be carried on by experienced investors with the ability to understand and process complex financial and economic information.

He wrote many articles for periodicals and encyclopedias on American and on Latin-American finance and trade, and published:  
 A History of Modern Banks of Issue (1896; fourth edition, 1909)
 The United States in the Orient: The Nature of an Economic Problem (1900)
 Alexander Hamilton (1901)
 Wall Street and the Country (1904)
 The Principles of Money and Banking (1905)

References

External links

 
 
 

1861 births
1915 deaths
American economics writers
American finance and investment writers
People from Winchester, Massachusetts
American essayists
American male essayists
Economists from Massachusetts